Kaveh Industrial City is the largest and oldest industrial city in Iran ( – Shahr-e Şanʿatī-ye Kāveh)  in the Central District of Saveh County, Markazi Province, Iran. At the 2006 census, its population was 2,554, in 773 families.

References 

Populated places in Saveh County